Indira Gandhi Sarani, formerly Red Road, is a road in Central Kolkata that runs from Eden Gardens (Rashmoni Avenue-Gostho Paul Sarani Junction) to Fort William West Gate (Dufferin Road-Outram Road Junction). South of Fort William West Gate, Red Road becomes Casuarina Road/Khiddirpore Road. The road, a wide boulevard, was built in 1820. It bisects the Kolkata Maidan. The British authorities intended for the road to be able to host large parades. The name 'Red Road' was given due to its surfacing.

During the Second World War, the road, in the heart of Calcutta, served as a landing strip for Fighter aircraft. The annual Kolkata Marathon starts from the outside of the Rangers Club on Red Road. The name 'Indira Gandhi Sarani' was adopted in 1985.

References

Roads in Kolkata
Monuments and memorials to Indira Gandhi